Prazon is a moshav in northern Israel. Located in the Ta'anakh region, it falls under the jurisdiction of Gilboa Regional Council.

History
The village was founded in 1953 by immigrants to Israel from Kurdistan on the land of the depopulated Palestinian village of Al-Mazar. 

Prazon was the second settlement in the Ta'anakh region after Avital. The name "Prazon" ("rural population") is taken from a verse in chapter 5, verse 7 of the Book of Judges: "The rural population in Israel ceased, until I, Deborah, arose."  The story described in Judges took place in the surrounding region.

The local football club, Hapoel Asi Gilboa, is based in Prazon.

References

Moshavim
Populated places in Northern District (Israel)
1953 establishments in Israel
Populated places established in 1953
Kurdish-Jewish culture in Israel